RJW v Guardian News and Media Limited ([2009] EWHC 2540 (QB)) also known as Trafigura v Guardian News and Media Limited and better known as the Trafigura case  was a 2009 legal action in which Trafigura attempted to use a super-injunction to prevent the press reporting details of toxic waste dumping in the Ivory Coast. This super-injunction was overturned after Paul Farrelly MP brought up the topic during Parliamentary Questions.

References

External links
High Court judgment

English privacy case law
Mass media in England
High Court of Justice cases
2009 in case law
2009 in British law
The Guardian